Musik may refer to:

Music
Die Musik (1901–1943), a German music magazine
Musik (album), the second studio album by Richie Hawtin
Musik (musical), the musical written by Jonathan Harvey and Pet Shop Boys
Musik (song), the Austrian entry at the Eurovision Song Contest 1971
The Musik, a 24-hour-a-day Urdu-language music channel from Pakistan

Other uses
Musik, Iran, a village in Kurdistan Province, Iran

See also
Music, an art form consisting of sound and silence, expressed through time.